The 2017 Wilson Security Sandown 500 was a motor racing event for Supercars, held from 15 to 17 September 2017 at Sandown Raceway in Melbourne, Victoria. It consisted of one race, scheduled for 499.744 kilometres in length (161 laps), it was shortened to 388 kilometres in length because of a time limit (4:48 p.m. local time) imposed by Supercars. It was the tenth event of fourteen in the 2017 Supercars Championship and hosted Race 19 of the season. It was also the first event of the 2017 Enduro Cup.

Background 
The event was the 47th running of the Sandown 500, which was first held in 1964 as a six-hour race for series production touring cars. It was the thirteenth time the race had been held as part of the Supercars Championship and the fifth time it formed part of the Enduro Cup. The defending winners of the race were Garth Tander and Warren Luff.

The event was promoted as a "retro round", with teams encouraged to use adaptations of Australian touring car liveries from the 1960s, 1970s and 1980s, although some teams extended beyond these parameters when devising a livery.

The following cars carried a retro livery during the event:

Results

Race

References

External links
 2017 Wilson Security Sandown 500, racing.natsoft.com.au, as archived at web.archive.org

Wilson Security Sandown 500
Wilson Security Sandown 500
Pre-Bathurst 500